In Greek mythology, Orestes (Ancient Greek: Ὀρέστης  "mountain dweller" derived either from orestias "of the mountains" or oresteros "mountainous" from oros "mountain") was the name of several figures, the most famous being Orestes, the son of Agamemnon and Clytemnestra.

Other figures named Orestes include:
 Orestes, one of the leaders of the satyrs who joined the army of Dionysus in his campaign against India.
Orestes, son of river god Achelous and princess Perimede, daughter of King Aeolus of Thessaly. He was the brother of Hippodamas.
 Orestes, a Greek warrior slain by Hector and Ares during the Trojan War.
 Orestes, a Trojan soldier who attacked the Achaean wall together with Asius and was killed by Leonteus, a Lapith leader.

Notes

References 

 Apollodorus, The Library with an English Translation by Sir James George Frazer, F.B.A., F.R.S. in 2 Volumes, Cambridge, MA, Harvard University Press; London, William Heinemann Ltd. 1921. ISBN 0-674-99135-4. Online version at the Perseus Digital Library. Greek text available from the same website.
Homer, The Iliad with an English Translation by A.T. Murray, Ph.D. in two volumes. Cambridge, MA., Harvard University Press; London, William Heinemann, Ltd. 1924. . Online version at the Perseus Digital Library.
Homer, Homeri Opera in five volumes. Oxford, Oxford University Press. 1920. . Greek text available at the Perseus Digital Library.
 Nonnus of Panopolis, Dionysiaca translated by William Henry Denham Rouse (1863-1950), from the Loeb Classical Library, Cambridge, MA, Harvard University Press, 1940.  Online version at the Topos Text Project.
 Nonnus of Panopolis, Dionysiaca. 3 Vols. W.H.D. Rouse. Cambridge, MA., Harvard University Press; London, William Heinemann, Ltd. 1940-1942. Greek text available at the Perseus Digital Library.

Satyrs
Children of Potamoi
Achaeans (Homer)
Trojans
Thessalian characters in Greek mythology
Thessalian mythology